Rory Doyle (born October 15, 1983) is an American photographer, based in Cleveland, Mississippi. Doyle's ongoing project, Delta Hill Riders, about African American cowboys and cowgirls has won Smithsonian magazine's annual Photo Contest and the Zeiss Photography Award at the Sony World Photography Awards.

He studied journalism at Saint Michael's College, Vermont.

Awards
2018: Grand Prize winner, Smithsonian magazine's annual Photo Contest, for a photograph from Delta Hill Riders
2018: Winner, The Photojournalist category, EyeEm Awards, Berlin
2019: Winner, Zeiss Photography Award, Sony World Photography Awards, World Photography Organisation, for Delta Hill Riders
2019: Shortlisted, Taylor Wessing Photographic Portrait Prize, London, for a photograph from Delta Hill Riders
2020: Finalist, Head On Portrait award, Head On Photo Awards, Head On Photo Festival, for a photograph from Delta Hill Riders

References

External links

American photojournalists
American photographers
Saint Michael's College alumni
People from Maine
Living people
1983 births